American Eagle Outfitters, Inc., also known as American Eagle, is an American lifestyle, clothing, and accessories retailer headquartered at SouthSide Works in Pittsburgh, Pennsylvania. It was founded in 1977 by brothers Jerry and Mark Silverman as a subsidiary of Retail Ventures, Inc., a company that also owned and operated Silverman's Menswear. The Silvermans sold their ownership interests in 1991 to Jacob Price of Knoxville, Tennessee. American Eagle Outfitters is also the parent company of Aerie.

The brand targets male and female university and high school students, although older adults also wear the brand. As of January 2021, the company operated 901 American Eagle stores, 175 Aerie stores, and 2 Todd Snyder stores in the U.S., Canada, Mexico, and Hong Kong. In 1977, the first American Eagle Outfitters store opened in Twelve Oaks Mall in Novi, Michigan.

Some of the brand's popular products are jeans, polo shirts, graphic T-shirts, boxers, outerwear, and swimwear.

Development 

American Eagle's beginning was with the Silverman family, which owned and operated Silvermans Menswear. By the mid-1970s, two of the Silverman brothers—the third generation of Silvermans in the family business—were running the business. Jerry Silverman was the president and CEO, while his brother, Mark, served as executive vice-president and COO. The Silverman brothers were convinced they needed to diversify their product offerings in order to continue growing their company. They also recognized that the addition of new family-owned chains would then enable them to operate more than one store in the same mall. Their first attempt was to open American Eagle Outfitters in 1977, positioning it as a proprietor of brand-name leisure apparel, footwear, as well as accessories for men and women, emphasizing merchandise suited for outdoor sports, such as hiking, mountain climbing, and camping. Stores were set up in shopping malls and a catalog was established. The chain grew for much of the 1980s. In 1989, the owners decided to refocus their business on American Eagle Outfitters, selling their other retail chains. At the time, there were 137 American Eagle Outfitters stores in 36 different states.

Despite the plans for quick growth after the reorganization, American Eagle Outfitters opened only 16 new stores by 1991 and the company was losing money. At this point, the Schottensteins, who had been 50% owners of the chain since 1980, bought out the Silverman family's interest. This change in leadership resulted in American Eagle finding its present niche: casual clothing for men and women selling private label clothes.

When the company began trading on the NASDAQ stock exchange in the second quarter of 1994, it had 167 stores and a healthy cash flow.  With the cash infusion from the IPO, the company opened more than 90 new stores over the next year. Several new executives joined the company in 1995 and '96, leading to another change in the target demographic.  Over the next five years, revenues quintupled to $1 billion by 2000. AEO opened the first Canadian store in 2000.

As of January 30, 2016, the company operated 949 AEO brand stores, and 97 stand-alone and 67 side-by-side Aerie stores in shopping malls, lifestyle centers, and street locations in the U.S., Canada, Mexico, Hong Kong, China, the United Kingdom, and internationally. The company had 21 franchised stores operated by franchise partners in 10 countries. On January 22, 2014, then-CEO Robert Hanson stepped down and Jay Schottenstein became interim CEO.

Finances and operations
On March 15, 2005, the company adjusted its accounting of rent expenses and construction allowances after the Securities and Exchange Commission noted that a number of companies had been improperly logging these items. Due to "disappointing product execution in the women's category", American Eagle posted only a 3% gain in its 2013 second-quarter profits and the stock price dropped.

Products 
On 27 July 2020, American Eagle Outfitters revealed it would sell a new range of fitness wear called "Offline" by Aerie, targeted at consumers who want apparel that can be used for both their workouts and relaxing.

Corporate and headquarters

In mid-2007, American Eagle moved its headquarters from Warrendale, Pennsylvania, to a more urban location at the SouthSide Works complex in Pittsburgh. The cost of the buildings and adjacent property was approximately $21 million (excluding interior finishing and additional construction costs). The addresses of the buildings are 19 Hot Metal Street and 77 Hot Metal Street, with the numbers symbolizing the first store opening in 1977. The Southside Works Campus includes a private garage, a lab store for each brand, a photo studio, and an in-house cafeteria. Other offices are in New York (design and production).

Franchise agreement
In June 2009, the company signed the franchisee agreement with M. H. Alshaya, one of the leading retailers of the Middle East. The agreement saw the introduction of the first stores outside North America, with the first two opening in Dubai and Kuwait on March 16 and 25, 2010, respectively, and another that opened on October 15, 2011, in Kaslik, Lebanon. Another opened in June 2012 in Hamra Street, Beirut, followed by one in Beirut City Centre, Hazmieh.

Logistics
The company maintains distribution centers in Hazleton, Pennsylvania; Ottawa, Kansas; and Mississauga, Ontario.

Stores

Items are placed on wooden shelving, tables, or clothes racks. The clothes in AEO Factory stores are hung on basic black hangers, and AEO stores have wooden hangers. There is usually a flat-screen television hanging in the back of the store or behind the cash wrap. The floors are typically wood or concrete. The theme and displays change based on seasonal lines and promotions.

Subsidiaries

aerie

In February 2006, American Eagle launched the aerie lingerie sub-brand, targeting American 15- to 22-year-old females. In addition to lingerie such as bras and other undergarments, the aerie line sells dorm wear, active apparel, loungewear, accessories and sleepwear. What started as a sub-brand quickly became a standalone concept in its own right, featuring a complete fitness line, called aerie f.i.t. The aerie brand is sold in American Eagle Outfitters stores, on the American Eagle website, and in stand-alone aerie retail stores. The first stand-alone aerie store opened in August 2006 in Greenville, South Carolina, and was followed by two more test stores later that year. As of December 2010, there were 147 stand-alone aerie stores in the U.S. and Canada. Aerie has started a campaign that focuses on promoting models' real bodies. This entails their slogan #AerieREAL and adding to their advertisements that models have not been retouched. In this way they take a stand against the use of photo manipulation in media. Iskra Lawrence, while she models for the lingerie line, is also the global role model for the brand.

Martin + Osa
The company's second stand-alone lifestyle concept launched in 2006 and targeted men and women age 28 to 40. It featured cashmere sweaters and casual clothing for an older target audience. It also sold products by Fred Perry, Ray-Ban, Adidas, Onitsuka Tiger, and HOBO International. In March 2010, management announced that all 28 Martin + Osa stores would be closed, after a failure in retail markets, causing AEO, Inc. to lose up to $44 million.

77kids
In October 2008, American Eagle released and launched 77kids, a line of clothing aimed at children age two to ten. Initially an online only concept, AEO opened its first 77kids store on July 15, 2010, in The Mall at Robinson in Pittsburgh, and eight others followed that year. Expansion continued throughout FY2011. 77kids stores, targeted at younger children, featured interactive games and activities throughout the stores that children could play with while shopping.

American Eagle Outfitters announced on May 15, 2012, that it would sell or close all 22 77kids stores by the end of July 2012. Robert Hanson, who became CEO in January 2012, said 77kids had a loss after taxes of roughly $24 million on sales of $40 million in the 2011 fiscal year. On August 3, 2012, American Eagle Outfitters completed the sale of its 77kids to Ezrani 2 Corp, a company formed by Ezra Dabah, the former chairman and CEO of The Children's Place. Ezrani renamed the stores "Ruum" in 2013.

Tailgate and Todd Snyder 
In November 2015, American Eagle Outfitters acquired Todd Snyder's eponymous label, as well as his Tailgate Clothing Company, a brand centered on vintage-style collegiate apparel. American Eagle initially focused on Southeastern Conference and Big Ten colleges, hoping to gain more popularity among its target demographic of teenagers and college students.

Bluenotes'
After its acquisition of Thiftys from Dylex, the 107 stores were rebranded as Bluenotes' in 2000, then sold off in 2004.

Quiet Logistics 
American Eagle Outfitters announced a $350 million acquisition of Quiet Logistics on November 2, 2021. The acquisition was completed on December 29, 2021.

International expansion
American Eagle opened its first Canadian store in 2001 after it purchased assets of Dylex. In 2010, AEO opened stores in Kuwait, Riyadh, and Dubai. A store in Kaslik, Lebanon, opened on October 15, 2011. A store in Cairo, Egypt, opened in late 2011. In September 2011, two stores opened in Moscow, Russia. Its first store in Jordan opened in November 2011 in the brand-new Taj Mall. Its first store in Tokyo, Japan opened on April 18, 2012. The first store in Tel Aviv, Israel, opened in February 2012, after the Israeli-based clothing retailer FOX signed a contract with AEO, and expanded to Jerusalem. There are also stores in Beijing, Shanghai and Hong Kong. American Eagle Outfitters opened its first store in the Philippines in March 2013.

American Eagle is also opening stores in Mexico. The first opened in Mexico City at Fashion Mall Perisur on February 20, 2013, and at Centro Santa Fe in June. Another opened in Guadalajara later in 2013 at Fashion Mall Galerías Guadalajara. In 2014 the company financed the rescue and renovation of the Jardín Edith Sánchez Ramírez pocket park in Mexico City.

American Eagle expanded to the U.K. in November 2014, opening stores in Westfield London, Westfield Stratford City, and Bluewater. The Westfield London store opened on November 14, 2014, the Westfield Stratford City store on November 17, 2014, and the Bluewater store on November 19, 2014. All UK operations have ceased, with the UK website closed and all UK stores closed by the end of July 2017.

American Eagle Outfitters opened its first store in Muscat, Oman, on October 3, 2015. The company made its debut in the Indian market in June 2018 with first store launched in DLF Mall of India, Noida. Today it operates 17 stores across the country.

AEO entered the Chilean market in September 2015, with the opening of its first store in the Parque Arauco shopping center. After its arrival in the Chilean market, the company's expansion was concentrated in Santiago.

In 2019, American Eagle Outfitters became one of only two major clothing companies with commitments in line with the Paris Agreement's goal of limiting global average temperature increase to 1.5 degrees Celsius.

In 2020, American Eagle Outfitters opened its first store in Prague, Czech Republic, in factory outlet center Fashion Arena Prague Outlet. In 2023, AEO opened its first store in Uruguay, in Punta Carretas Shopping.

New American Music Union
American Eagle was the primary sponsor of New American Music Union, a music festival at SouthSide Works in Pittsburgh on August 8 and 9, 2008. The concert featured Gnarls Barkley, Spoon, The Raconteurs, and Bob Dylan and his band. The festival, which had been planned as an annual event, did not recur, because American Eagle had moved away from using music as a marketing tool.

Controversies

Strike
In 2004, textile and apparel workers union UNITE HERE launched the "American Vulture" back-to-school boycott of American Eagle in protest of alleged workers' rights violations at the company's Canadian distribution contractor National Logistics Services (NLS). On the 2007 second-quarter conference call, CEO James O'Donnell clarified the American Eagle's relationship with NLS and its effect on business. He explained,

Abercrombie & Fitch lawsuits
Since 1999, Abercrombie & Fitch has sued American Eagle Outfitters at least three times for allegedly copying its designs and its advertisements. On all occasions, American Eagle prevailed in court on the grounds that A&F cannot stop it from presenting similar designs since such designs cannot be copyrighted in the United States. Nevertheless, American Eagle clothing designs have since trended away in appearance from Abercrombie & Fitch designs. American Eagle merchandise is considered "retro/vintage" cost-efficient clothing, whereas Abercrombie & Fitch merchandise has become an internationally known "near-luxury" line of clothing with "preppy", high-grade, and high-priced fashions, on the same level with that of companies such as Polo Ralph Lauren.  Judges have generally ruled that giving Abercrombie exclusive rights to market its clothing in a certain way "would be anti-competitive."

International stores
Locations in the U.S., Canada, Mexico, and Hong Kong are operated directly by American Eagle, whereas other locations are operated under license agreements with third parties.

See also

 List of S&P 400 companies

References

External links
 
 

Companies listed on the New York Stock Exchange
Companies formerly listed on the Nasdaq
Companies based in Pittsburgh
Clothing retailers of the United States
Clothing brands of the United States
2000s fashion
2010s fashion
2020s fashion
Retail companies established in 1977
Clothing companies established in 1977
1977 establishments in Pennsylvania
Clothing brands
1994 initial public offerings
American companies established in 1977